Deus Mkutu (born 19 April 1991) is a Malawian football striker who currently plays for Moyale Barracks.

References

1991 births
Living people
Malawian footballers
Malawi international footballers
Moyale Barracks FC players
Association football forwards